A'Court or Acourt is a surname. People with this surname include:

 Alan A'Court (1934–2009), English footballer
 Charles A'Court (1819–1903), Liberal Party politician in the United Kingdom
 Dennis A'Court (1937–2021), Welsh cricketer who played for Gloucestershire
 Michèle A'Court (born 1961), New Zealand comedian
 Samuel A'Court Ashe (1840–1938), Confederate infantry captain in the American Civil War
 Acourt, 15th century French composer

See also
 William à Court (disambiguation)

References

Surnames of English origin